Barnsley is a locality in south central Manitoba, Canada. It is located approximately 10 kilometers (6 miles) north of Carman, Manitoba in the Rural Municipality of Dufferin.

References 

Localities in Manitoba
Unincorporated communities in Pembina Valley Region